Kaposvári Vizilabda Klub is a water polo club from Kaposvár, Hungary. The team competes in the Országos Bajnokság I.

Team

Technical staff
  Head Coach: Szilveszter Fekete

Squad changes for the 2015-16 season
In
  Krisztián Polovic ( from PVSK )
 Nikola Nikolov ( from  Pays d'Aix )
 Norbert Juhász-Szelei ( from Vasas )
Out
 Zoltán Ágner ( to Fehérvár Póló )
  Gros Ronen ( to MVLC )
 Jeremy Davie ( to  )
 Oliver Vikalo ( to  )
 László Surányi ( to PVSK )

Recent seasons

Rankings in OB I

Notable former players
Zoltán Szécsi  ( 2000 Sydney, 2004 Athens, 2008 Beijing ) 13-

References

External links
 

Water polo clubs in Hungary
Sports clubs in Kaposvár